The Constitution of the Latvian Socialist Soviet Republic was adopted by the 1st Congress of the Executive Committee of the Soviet of Workers, Soldiers, and the Landless in Latvia (Iskolat) on . The constitution was the first constitution of the modern Latvia, prior to the adoption of the Constitution of Latvia on 7 November 1922.

The territory of the Latvian Socialist Soviet Republic, which includes Kurzeme, Vidzeme and Latgale, was rearranged into provinces. The Supreme Council of Latvian Workers' Deputies was appointed as the highest state authority of the Latvian SSR. The Congress elected the Latvian Centarl Executive Committee, whose members elected a presidium from among them, which was the government at the same time. The local Soviet government were the councils and executive bodies of the county councils and parish workers' deputies which acted as their executive committees. The Soviet congress and councils had the same standards of representation from cities and rural areas.

The section of the basic rights and duties of citizens were taken over from the 1918 Constitution of the Russian SFSR.

History 

On the establishment of the Latvian Socialist Soviet Republic on December 17, 1918, a manifest on the behalf of the Iskolat was declared. The manifest declared the establishment of communism in Latvia. This manifest led to the acknowledgement of the existence of the Latvian SSR by the Russian SFSR five days later, and as a basis for the promulgation of the constitution of the Latvian SSR on January 15, 1918.

The discussion for the constitution began during the 1st Congress of the Iskolat from 13 until 15 January 1919. The congress itself adopted two resolutions on the foreign relations and the elections. It was decided in the congress that the Latvian SSR opens mutual relations with the Russian SFSR as a foundation of the formation of the Soviet Union, and only the working class, included landless and riflemen, is allowed to participate in elections, to symbolize the power of the workers' councils in Latvia.

The constitution was adopted at the end of this congress, on 15 January 1919. The constitution was signed by Pēteris Stučka as the Chairman of the Council of People's Commissars of the Latvian Socialist Soviet Republic, the eight members of the Presidium of the CEC of the Latvian SSR, and J. Jaunzems as the Secretary of the CEC of the Latvian SSR.

The constitution itself lasted for only one year. On 13 January 1920, the Latvian SSR was disestablished, following its defeat in the Battle of Daugavpils.

Signatories 
Ten members of the government of the Latvian SSR signed the constitution.
 Pēteris Stučka (1865–1932)
 Jūlijs Daniševskis (1884–1938)
 Kārlis Pētersons (1877–1928)
  (1887–1938)
  (1881–1939)
 Fricis Roziņš (1870–1919) 
  (1884–1942) 
 Jānis Bērziņš (1881—1938) 
  (1892–1932) 
  (1891–1921)

Structure 
The Constitution is divided into 7 chapters and 31 articles, making it the shortest Soviet constitution ever promulgated.
 The Basic Provisions
 The Organization of the Central Government
 The Organization of Local Soviet Government
 The Law on Elections
 The Rights and Procedures of Elections
 The Central and Local Income and Expenditure Budget
 The Flag and Seal of the Latvian SSR

Notes

References

Bibliography 
 
 
 

Latvian constitutional law
Latvia
Latvian Socialist Soviet Republic
1919 in Latvia
1919 legislation
Latvian Socialist Soviet Republic